Nalton may refer to:

 James Nalton (1600?–1662), English Presbyterian minister
 Nalton Womersley (1859–1930), British tennis player

See also
 Naltona, village in Bangladesh